The Church in Kumehnen is a church in the Kumachyovo district in Kaliningrad, Russia.  Built in the 14th century, it is a Brick Gothic church. It was famous for its Baroque altar by the sculptor  from 1676. In 1945, the church was damaged.

References 

Churches in Kaliningrad Oblast
Gothic architecture in Russia